Merica Lane Lindell, (born July 4, 1990) from Tampa, Florida, is a United States fashion model and beauty pageant contestant. Lindell, born July 4, 1990, was appointed as Miss World United States 2008.  As a model she has worked for Abercrombie and Fitch and Gucci. She represented the United States in Miss World 2008 in Johannesburg, South Africa, on December 13; where she was a semi-finalist and won the evening gown competition. She earned her B.A. degree from the Grady School of Journalism at the University of Georgia and is a member of Kappa Delta sorority. She graduated from H.B. Plant High School.

References 

Female models from Florida
Henry B. Plant High School alumni
Living people
Miss World 2008 delegates
People from Tampa, Florida
1990 births
21st-century American women